Cristian Hidalgo González (born 21 September 1983), known simply as Cristian, is a Spanish professional footballer who plays for Andorran club FC Ordino as a winger.

Football career
Born in Barcelona, Catalonia, Cristian was a product of FC Barcelona's youth system. He scored three goals during 2003–04 and four in the following season, while performing as a forward with the B-team. The club's coaches would, however, change his role into one of a winger, and he impressed in this position, ending 2005–06 with 11 third division goals; he also played one official game for the main squad, a Copa del Rey match against Zamora CF.

Cristian signed for Deportivo de La Coruña as a free agent in the 2006–07 campaign, making his La Liga debut on 27 August 2006 as he came from the bench in a 3–2 home win over Real Zaragoza. As a starter, he scored his first top level goal in a 2–0 success against Real Madrid, also at the Estadio Riazor.

In his second year, Cristian netted his second league goal ever, in a 9 December 2007 defeat against his former employers, 1–2 at the Camp Nou. He would only appear in 14 league matches during the season, however.

After featuring even less in 2008–09, Cristian was released and joined Hércules CF in the second division on a three-year deal. He contributed with 23 games and three goals in his debut campaign (but only three starts) as the Alicante side returned to the top flight after 13 years.

In mid-March 2012, after seeing out his contract, Cristian signed with Elche CF in division two. He had been limited to training with Hércules for several months.

29-year-old Cristian moved abroad for the first time ever in 2012–13, splitting the season between Cyprus' and Alki Larnaca FC and Bulgarian club PFC Cherno More Varna. He was drafted by Chennaiyin FC in the second round of the 2014 ISL Inaugural International Draft, scoring his first goal for the club from a free kick against Mumbai City FC where he played in place of injured Elano, and contributing to a 3–0 away win.

In January 2015, Cristian signed for his fifth club in three years, joining Morocco's Moghreb Tétouan until June 2016.

Club statistics

References

External links

1983 births
Living people
Footballers from Barcelona
Spanish footballers
Association football wingers
La Liga players
Segunda División players
Segunda División B players
Tercera División players
FC Barcelona C players
FC Barcelona Atlètic players
FC Barcelona players
Deportivo de La Coruña players
Hércules CF players
Elche CF players
EC Granollers players
Cypriot First Division players
Alki Larnaca FC players
First Professional Football League (Bulgaria) players
PFC Cherno More Varna players
Israeli Premier League players
Bnei Sakhnin F.C. players
Indian Super League players
Chennaiyin FC players
Botola players
Moghreb Tétouan players
Liga II players
CSM Ceahlăul Piatra Neamț players
FC Ordino players
Catalonia international footballers
Spanish expatriate footballers
Expatriate footballers in Cyprus
Expatriate footballers in Bulgaria
Expatriate footballers in Israel
Expatriate footballers in India
Expatriate footballers in Morocco
Expatriate footballers in Romania
Expatriate footballers in Andorra
Spanish expatriate sportspeople in Cyprus
Spanish expatriate sportspeople in Bulgaria
Spanish expatriate sportspeople in Israel
Spanish expatriate sportspeople in India
Spanish expatriate sportspeople in Morocco
Spanish expatriate sportspeople in Romania
Spanish expatriate sportspeople in Andorra